The twenty-sixth season of the American animated sitcom series South Park premiered on Comedy Central on February 8, 2023. The season will consist of six episodes, with each episode having next-day availability on HBO Max in the United States.

Production
On January 17, 2023, Comedy Central released a teaser video announcing the upcoming debut of Season 26, but with no start date announced. On January 20, the video description was updated to announce a debut date of February 8, which was then confirmed by other sources including the official South Park Twitter feed.

Episodes

References

 
2023 American television seasons